Oncosiphon is a small genus of flowering plants in the daisy family (Asteraceae). All known species are native to southern Africa.

Species
, the following species are listed in Kew's Plants of the World Online:

References

Anthemideae
Asteraceae genera
Flora of Africa